Pseudorhaphitoma ichthys  is a small sea snail, a marine gastropod mollusk in the family Mangeliidae.

Description
The length of the shell varies between 4.5 mm and 9 mm.

The small, delicate, fusiform shell has a light or pinkish brown color. It contains 7 whorls, of which two bulbous whorls in the protoconch. The third whorl is slightly crenulate. The other whorls show six ribs, continuous with each other and broadened. They are impressed at the shallow suture. The aperture is oblong. The outer lip is very wide. The sinus is broad, short and shallow and not extending far towards the margin of the outer lip. The columella is straight and is not produced at its base. The narrow siphonal canal is short and rather straight.

Distribution
This marine species occurs in the Persian Gulf, off South Africa and off Taiwan.

References

 R.N. Kilburn, Turridae (Mollusca: Gastropoda) of southern Africa and Mozambique. Part 7. Subfamily Mangeliinae, section 2; Annals of the Natal Museum 34, pp 317 - 367 (1993)

External links
 
 

ichthys
Gastropods described in 1910